Åke Hansson (7 May 1927 – 6 September 2015) was a Swedish footballer who played as a midfielder.

References

Association football midfielders
Swedish footballers
Allsvenskan players
Malmö FF players
1927 births
2015 deaths